The Habeas Corpus Suspension Act 1745 (19 Geo. II, c.1) was an Act of Parliament of the Parliament of Great Britain passed on 18 October 1745, and formally repealed in 1867. It made various provisions for arresting and imprisoning those suspected of treason during the Second Jacobite Rising. The Act was continued in force by a second Act of the same title (19 Geo. II, c.17) and by a third act the next year (20 Geo. II, c.1) before expiring.

The Act provided that those suspected of high treason could be detained without bail until 19 April 1746; their horses could be seized and the owners charged for their keeping. Members of Parliament were exempt from the Act unless the consent of their House was given. For the duration of the Act, the Scottish act preventing wrongful imprisonment was suspended.

The Act remained in force until April 19, 1746, when it was renewed, and was formally repealed as obsolete by the Statute Law Revision Act 1867.

References

The statutes at large from the 15th to the 20th year of King George III [vol. XVIII]; Charles Bathurst, London. 1765.
Chronological table of the statutes; HMSO, London. 1993. 

Great Britain Acts of Parliament 1745
Repealed Great Britain Acts of Parliament
Habeas corpus